Tharoth Sam is a Cambodian actress and mixed martial artist specializing in the Khmer fighting style of Bokator. She has previously competed in ONE FC.

Biography
Sam grew up in a refugee camp on the border of Cambodia and Thailand. Her father, Oum Dara, was a violinist and songwriter. When Sam was 18 years old, she started studying Bokator, a traditional Khmer fighting style, and she entered in her first martial arts fight in 2014. She was coached by Chan Reach Kun Khmer, a Cambodian-American mixed martial arts fighter, and San Kim Sean. As a fighter, she is known by the nickname Little Frog.

In 2017, she appeared in the films Jailbreak and First They Killed My Father. She also appeared in Loung Preah Sdach Korn, a historical film.

Mixed martial arts record 

|-
| Win
| align=center| 4–2
| Kaewjai Prachumwong
| Submission (Armbar)
| FMD - Full Metal Dojo 15: Come Out to Play
| 
| align=center|3
| align=center|4:47
| Bangkok, Thailand
|
|-
| Win
| align=center| 3–2
| Surarak Kamla
| Submission (Rear-Naked Choke)
| FMD - Full Metal Dojo 14: Bigger, Badder, Blacker, Madder
| 
| align=center|3
| align=center|4:26
| Bangkok, Thailand
|
|-
| Loss
| align=center| 2–2
| Jeet Toshi
| Decision (unanimous)
| ONE Championship: Kingdom of Khmer
| 
| align=center|3
| align=center|5:00
| Phnom Penh, Cambodia
|
|-
| Loss
| align=center| 2–1
| Jujeath Nagaowa
| TKO (Punches and Elbows)
| ONE FC 23: Warrior's Way
| 
| align=center|2
| align=center|3:34
| Manila, Philippines
|
|-
| Win
| align=center| 2–0
| Vy Srey Khouch
| Technical Submission (Armbar)
| One FC 20 - Rise of the Kingdom
| 
| align=center|1
| align=center|2:36
| Phnom Penh, Cambodia
|
|-
| Win
| align=center| 1–0
| Srey Moa Theoun
| Submission (Armbar)
| Bayon Khmer MMA - BKM
| 
| align=center|1
| align=center|3:12
| Phnom Penh, Cambodia
|

Filmography

References

External links 
 
 

Living people
Cambodian female mixed martial artists
Atomweight mixed martial artists
Mixed martial artists utilizing Bokator
Cambodian film actresses
1991 births